Found is a 2021 documentary film directed and produced by Amanda Lipitz. An international co-production of the United States and China, it follows three adopted teenage girls who discover they are blood-related cousins on 23andMe and travel to China seeking answers about their identity and family history.

Found had its world premiere at the Hamptons International Film Festival on October 9, 2021. It was released on October 20, 2021, by Netflix, and received critical acclaim for its emotional poignancy.

Subjects 
The film centers around three blood-related cousins born in China and adopted by American families:

 Chloe Lipitz, a 13-year-old girl adopted by a Jewish family living in Seattle and later Phoenix
 Sadie Mangelsdorf, a 14-year-old girl adopted by a Christian family with divorced parents in Nashville
 Lily Bolka, a 17-year-old girl adopted by a large Catholic family in Oklahoma City

Synopsis
The film follows three adopted teenage girls who discover they are blood-related cousins through the DNA testing service 23andMe. After connecting with each other virtually, they meet up with each other and with genealogist Liu Hao from the company My China Roots to travel to China seeking answers about their identity and family history. They visit the sites where their parents left them, the orphanages where they stayed, and possible parents who gave up their children for adoption. Throughout, they and others wrestle with questions of identity and the implications of the one-child policy. None of the parents ultimately match with them, but in the closing moments of the film one of the possible parents matches with another girl.

Production 
The director, Amanda Lipitz, is Chloe's aunt. Found is her second major documentary, following 2017's Step. She traveled to China three times over the course of the production, the final journey with the girls. The documentary was filmed in the cinéma vérité style; Lipitz stated that respecting the girls' emotional well-being during production was a central concern. Shooting was completed just before the onset of the COVID-19 pandemic.

Release
In August 2021, Netflix announced it had acquired distribution rights to the film. It had its world premiere at the Hamptons International Film Festival on October 9, 2021. It was released on October 20, 2021. The three girls reported that they were overwhelmed with correspondences from other adoptees around the world after the release.

Critical reception
The film received critical acclaim and was widely praised for its emotional poignancy.  

Reviewing for The New York Times, Lisa Kennedy wrote that the film is "rife with poignant moments" and praised the "three beautifully complex" depictions of its subjects. John Anderson in The Wall Street Journal praised Lipitz's sensitivity to the painful aspects of the story but wrote that its narrow focus left him with some questions. Nina Metz in the Chicago Tribune called the film "deeply moving" and wrote that she was "drawn in by the conflicting feelings colliding at all once: Mutual grief and joy, but also confusion." In the Los Angeles Times, Katie Walsh wrote that "Lipitz demonstrates a deep empathy and interest in the inner lives of teenage girls", concluding that it makes a power argument for a unique kind of familial love among adoptees. Angie Han in The Hollywood Reporter wrote that the film "goes out of its way to consider the situation from all angles, and what might look from the outside like a simple story spills over with complicated emotions once it’s been cracked open." She also praised its "unfussy, unhurried approach to the story that prioritizes immediate lived experience over detached analysis or splashy reveals", its ability to "[feel] intimate but not exploitative", and its "comfort with ambivalence and ambiguity". In TheWrap, Ronda Racha Penrice wrote that "'Found' is told with such genuine love that it’s frequently hard to hold back tears."

References

External links
 
 
 
 

2021 films
2021 documentary films
American documentary films
Chinese documentary films
Documentary films about adoption
Documentary films about China
Films scored by Toby Chu
Netflix original documentary films
2020s American films